Love Is Blind is a 2016 Philippine fantasy-romantic comedy film written and directed by Jason Paul Laxamana and produced by Regal Entertainment Inc. The film stars Derek Ramsay, Solenn Heussaff, Kiray Celis and Kean Cipriano. It was released on February 10, 2016, under Regal Films.

In Love Is Blind, the main character, Fe, played by Kiray Celis, uses a magic potion that causes her handsome crush Wade (Derek Ramsay) to see her as more attractive than she actually is.

Plot
The film starts with Fe (Kiray Celis) being pimped out by her aunt (Beverly Salviejo). Fe knows that with her sister being beautiful, people will ask inappropriate questions regarding her looks, and her chances of finding true love are limited since looks don't matter when finding partners. So she hunts down her probable suitor and leaves for work. Fe is an intern at Luxent Hotel in Quezon City. There she meets Wade (Derek Ramsay), who is about to attend a conference about farming. Wade doesn’t really want to be a farmer or want anything to do with their family’s business even though it was theirs longer than he knows.

Wade is experiencing a fallout with his girlfriend Maggie (Solenn Heussaff) because he’s pressured of being better than himself and what others think of him, especially his high school friends. Fe’s admiration to Wade grows more as time progresses, seeing him every day at work but being able to do anything about it frustrates her. She goes to Yari (Kean Cipriano), who conveniently works as a masseur at the hotel but also sells potions and charms for hopeless cases on love. Yari helps Fe with her problem with Wade, making her a potion that would make her the most beautiful person in the eyes of Wade alone. Fe named herself Felicity for Wade. But in the process Yari is falling in love with Fe.

However, the potion Yari made for Fe doesn’t have the right ingredients resulting it to wear off and revealing Fe’s true looks to Wade. After a fight, Wade and Fe clear and patch things up as Wade returns to the arms of his love, Maggie. Fe realizes that all along, there was someone there who cares for her, Yari. But as soon as she confronts him, he saw the same ingredients they made for an everlasting love potion with their picture in it. Fe confused, storms out and thought that she was bewitched by Yari for him to love her. But the two did not know that the contents of the potion were replaced by pure water.

While Fe drowns herself in pity as she lost the chance at love, she is disturbed by a shouting Yari who rushed to her once he knew about the potion being replaced. The two ended up together and Fe eventually realized that there’s someone who can love her the way that she is.

Cast
Derek Ramsay as Wade Santillan
Kiray Celis as Fe
Solenn Heussaff as Maggie / Felicity
Kean Cipriano as Yari Baltazar
Chynna Ortaleza as Ms. Janet
Ken Alfonso as Zach
Albert Sumaya Jr. as Sawali
Maureen Larrazabal as Ms. Noemi
Beverly Salviejo as Apung Kring Kring
Johnny Revilla as Wade's Dad
Kiko Matos as Anthony
Niña Jose as Gracie
Lemuel Pelayo as Roger
Jef Gaitan as Diorella
Rolando Inocencio as Facilitator
Izzy Canillo as Binhi
Kleggy Abaya as Boods
EJ Jallorina as Uma
Maey Bautista as Crying Lady in the Beach
Gonzalo Matos as Arnold
Lawrence Yap as Yuan
Rolini Pineda as Fatima

References

2016 films
Philippine romantic comedy films
2016 romantic comedy films
2010s Tagalog-language films
2010s English-language films
Regal Entertainment films
2016 multilingual films
Philippine multilingual films